Nikita Andreyevich Morgachyov (born 3 May 1981) is a Russian rower. Competing in the quadruple sculls he won the 2007 European title and placed seventh-eighth at the 2008 and 2012 Olympics. He was disqualified from the 2016 Games after his teammate Sergey Fedorovtsev failed a drug test in 2016. Morgachyov won two more medals at the 2014–2015 European championships in the eighth.  He was removed from the squad for the 2020 Olympics after failing a drugs test.

References

External links
 

1981 births
Living people
Russian male rowers
Rowers from Moscow
Olympic rowers of Russia
Rowers at the 2008 Summer Olympics
Rowers at the 2012 Summer Olympics
Rowers at the 2016 Summer Olympics
European Rowing Championships medalists